List of final courts of appeal in Canada. For details on the court system, see Canadian court system.

Canada

Supreme Court of Canada

Federal courts

Federal Court of Appeal

Court Martial Appeal Court of Canada

Alberta

Alberta Court of Appeal

British Columbia

Court of Appeal for British Columbia

Manitoba

Manitoba Court of Appeal

New Brunswick

Court of Appeal of New Brunswick

Newfoundland and Labrador

Court of Appeal of Newfoundland and Labrador

Northwest Territories

Court of Appeal for the Northwest Territories

Nova Scotia

Nova Scotia Court of Appeal

Nunavut

Court of Appeal of Nunavut

Ontario

Court of Appeal for Ontario

Prince Edward Island

Court of Appeal of Prince Edward Island

Quebec

Cour d'appel du Québec

Saskatchewan

Court of Appeal for Saskatchewan

Yukon

Court of Appeal of Yukon

See also 
 State supreme court, for equivalent appellate courts within various American states
 United States courts of appeals, for equivalent courts at the federal government level in that country